Mursalimkino (Mörsälim) is a rural locality (a selo) and the administrative centre of Meshchegarovsky Selsoviet, Salavatsky District, Bashkortostan, Russia. The population was 2,203 as of 2010. There are 43 streets.

Geography 
Mursalimkino is located 49 km southeast of Maloyaz (the district's administrative centre) by road. Novosyuryukayevo is the nearest rural locality.

References 

Rural localities in Salavatsky District